The fast marching method is a numerical method created by James Sethian for solving boundary value problems of the Eikonal equation:

 
 

Typically, such a problem describes the evolution of a closed surface as a function of time  with speed  in the normal direction at a point  on the propagating surface. The speed function is specified, and the time at which the contour crosses a point  is obtained by solving the equation. Alternatively,  can be thought of as the minimum amount of time it would take to reach  starting from the point . The fast marching method takes advantage of this optimal control interpretation of the problem in order to build a solution outwards starting from the "known information", i.e. the boundary values.

The algorithm is similar to Dijkstra's algorithm and uses the fact that information only flows outward from the seeding area. This problem is a special case of level-set methods. More general algorithms exist but are normally slower.

Extensions to non-flat (triangulated) domains solving

 

Algorithm

First, assume that the domain has been discretized into a mesh. We will refer to meshpoints as nodes. Each node  has a corresponding value .

The algorithm works just like Dijkstra's algorithm but differs in how the nodes' values are calculated. In Dijkstra's algorithm, a node's value is calculated using a single one of the neighboring nodes.

Nodes are labeled as far (not yet visited), considered (visited and value tentatively assigned), and accepted (visited and value permanently assigned).

If  then set  and label  as considered.
 Let  be the considered node with the smallest value . Label  as accepted.
 For every neighbor  of  that is not-accepted, calculate a tentative value .
 If  then set . If  was labeled as far, update the label to considered.
 If there exists a considered node, return to step 3. Otherwise, terminate.

See also
 Level-set method
 Fast sweeping method
 Bellman–Ford algorithm

External links
 Dijkstra-like Methods for the Eikonal Equation J.N. Tsitsiklis, 1995
 The Fast Marching Method and its Applications by James A. Sethian
 Multi-Stencils Fast Marching Methods 
 Multi-Stencils Fast Marching Matlab Implementation
 Implementation Details of the Fast Marching Methods
 Generalized Fast Marching method by Forcadel et al. [2008] for applications in image segmentation.
 Python Implementation of the Fast Marching Method
See Chapter 8 in Design and Optimization of Nano-Optical Elements by Coupling Fabrication to Optical Behavior

Notes

Numerical differential equations